Inocente Lizano (born 28 December 1940) is a Cuban former cyclist. He competed in the individual pursuit and the team pursuit events at the 1968 Summer Olympics.

References

External links
 

1940 births
Living people
Cuban male cyclists
Olympic cyclists of Cuba
Cyclists at the 1968 Summer Olympics